Moshe Roas (born 1981) is an Israeli artist, who works in sculpture, drawing, printmaking and installation art. He has exhibited in galleries and museums in Netherlands, (Germany), Poland, United States, South Korea and Israel. These include the Tel Aviv Museum of Art, the Eretz Israel Museum, the Jerusalem Print Workshop and the Tel Aviv Artists' House.

Many of his works are created in processes of decomposition and reassembly, and deal with decay, life, death and time. Roas lives in Kibbutz Palmachim and teaches printmaking in Tel Aviv and Givat Haviva.

Biography
Roas was born in Safed and grew up in Karmiel. He studied textile design at Shenkar College of Engineering and Design, where he graduated in 2008. In 2009, he was awarded the Young Designer Competition in Talente, Munich, and an honorable mention at an international art competition in Cheongju, South Korea. In 2014 he was awarded the design prize by the Ministry of Culture and Sport and a guest artist's scholarship at the Jerusalem Print Workshop. In the years 2016–2018 he studied at the Postgraduate Fine Art Program at HaMidrasha – Faculty of the Arts, Beit Berl College. He also studied printmaking in Venice and Portland, Maine.

Exhibitions

Solo exhibitions
 And the Winners are: Prizes of the Ministry of Culture and Sport for Art and Design, Tel Aviv Museum, 2014, Curators: Maya Vinitzky and Noa Rosenberg
 Artist Wall: Einat Amir hosts Moshe Roas, Art Cube Artists' Studios, Jerusalem, 2014
 Undoing, Periscope Gallery, 2013, curator: Irena Gordon

Group exhibitions
 Exercises in Flexibility, HaMidrasha Gallery – Hayarkon 19, Tel Aviv, 2018. Curator: Nogah Davidson
 On the Edge – Israeli Paper, Eretz Israel Museum, Tel Aviv, 2017. Curator: Anat Gatenio
 Sculpture: Allegories of the Present, Artists' House, Tel Aviv, 2016. curator: Irena Gordon
 Same Sky Same land, Pulchri Studio, The Hague, Netherlands, 2015. Curator: Uri Tzaig
 Same Sky Same land, LJGalerie , Amsterdam, Netherlands, 2015. Curator: Uri Tzaig
 The Design Museum at the Artists' House, Artists' House, Tel Aviv, 2014, Curator: Yuval Saar
 Woven Consciousness – Biennale for Textile, Eretz Israel Museum, 2014. Curator: Irena Gordon
 Traces V – Beyond Paper, Jerusalem, 2013. Curator: Tal Yahas
 Fresh Design 6 / 2013, Design Fair, Tel Aviv.
 International Contemporary Furniture Fair – ICFF, New York City, 2013
 14 International Triennial of Tapestry Łódź, Poland, 2013
 TextiLiri, Periscope Gallery, 2012, curator: Ayala Raz
 Expo 2012, Yeosu, South Korea
 Fresh Paint 5 / 2012, Art Fair, Tel Aviv
 Pass Forward, The Ranch Gallery, Holon, 2011
 Hot – Innovation in Design, Mitchell Gallery, Shenkar College of Engineering and Design, Ramat Gan, 2009. Curator: Prof. Yarom Vardimon
 The 6th Cheongju International Craft Competition, South Korea, 2009
 Talente 2009, International Young Designers Exhibition, Munich, (Germany)

External links
 Roas’ website
  Curator Irena Gordon on the work of Moshe Roas, the YouTube channel of the Eretz Israel Museum, 30 March 2014
  Interview with Moshe Roas on the television program London et Kirschenbaum from the YouTube Channel of the HaMidrasha – Faculty of the Arts, 4 June 2018

References

1981 births
Living people
Israeli Jews
People from Safed
21st-century Israeli sculptors
Israeli etchers
21st-century Israeli male artists
Israeli contemporary artists
HaMidrasha – Faculty of the Arts alumni